Worthington's Quarters, White Hall, Glen Burnie, Iris Hill, is a historic forced-labor farm in Columbia in Howard County, Maryland, United States.

The stucco-covered brick plantation house resides on a 150-acre tract, "Wincopin Neck", surveyed for Richard and Benjamin Warfield. The land tract "Worthington's Addition" was also considered part of the estate when started as early as 1710. Richard Warfiled II (??-1755) hired out the property (called "Warfield's Contrivance") and house to Alexander Warfield and Elizabeth Ridgely in 1755, who had opened and operated a mill in 1750, downstream from the site at Guilford, Maryland. Rezin and Honor (Howard) Warfield lived onsite next. Their daughter Anne Warfield and Revolutionary War Major Richard Lawrance settled there next, calling the manor "White Hall". Dr. Charles Griffith Worthington purchased the lands and manor, passing it to his son Brice Worthington, and later his nephew Dr. William Henry Worthington (1812-1886). By 1858, five generations of the family were buried in the onsite family graveyard.

The site is located along the Middle Patuxent River, which once stood two bridges leading to Laurel. In 1936, the vacant estate was known as the Hegemen House.

See also
Montpelier Mansion (Fulton, Maryland)
Wincopia Farms
White Hall (Ellicott City, Maryland) - Manor by the same name in Ellicott city
White Hall Hickory Ridge (Highland, Maryland) - Manor by the same name in Highland
List of Howard County properties in the Maryland Historical Trust

References

Houses in Howard County, Maryland
Guilford, Maryland
Plantation houses in Maryland